

The Dart Pup (originally the Dunstable Dart) was a British single-seat ultralight monoplane designed and built by Zander and Weyl (later Dart Aircraft) at Dunstable, Bedfordshire.

Development
The Pup was a single-seat parasol wing monoplane with an Ava flat-four pusher engine mounted on the wing trailing edge. The wings could be folded back for storage. The Pup registered G-AELR first flew in July 1936.

In 1937 the Pup was fitted with a 36 hp (27 kW) Bristol Cherub engine, a taller landing gear and a modified rudder. In August 1938 it crashed and was destroyed on takeoff.

Specifications (Ava-powered)

References

Notes

Bibliography

1930s British sport aircraft
Ultralight aircraft
Pup
Parasol-wing aircraft
Single-engined pusher aircraft
Aircraft first flown in 1936